Benoït Audran, called the Younger, to distinguish him from his uncle, was a French artist born in Paris in 1698, and died there in 1772. He was the son
and pupil of Jean Audran, and engraved in the same manner as his father. He engraved prints after Paolo Veronese, Poussin, Natoire, Lancret, Watteau, and other French artists.

References
 

1698 births
1772 deaths
18th-century engravers
Engravers from Lyon